In chemistry, dehydrogenation is a chemical reaction that involves the removal of hydrogen, usually from an organic molecule. It is the reverse of hydrogenation.  Dehydrogenation is important, both as a useful reaction and a serious problem.  At its simplest, it is useful way of converting alkanes, which are relatively inert and thus low-valued, to olefins, which are reactive and thus more valuable. Alkenes are precursors to aldehydes, alcohols, polymers, and aromatics.  As a problematic reaction, the fouling and inactivation of many catalysts arises via coking, which is the dehydrogenative polymerization of organic substrates.

Enzymes that catalyze dehydrogenation are called dehydrogenases.

Heterogeneous catalytic routes

Styrene
Dehydrogenation processes are used extensively to produce aromatics  in the petrochemical industry. Such processes are highly endothermic and require temperatures of 500 °C and above. Dehydrogenation also converts saturated fats to unsaturated fats. One of the largest scale dehydrogenation reactions is the production of styrene by dehydrogenation of ethylbenzene.  Typical dehydrogenation catalysts are based on iron(III) oxide, promoted by several percent potassium oxide or potassium carbonate.
C6H5CH2CH3 -> C6H5CH=CH2 + H2

Other alkenes
The importance of catalytic dehydrogenation of paraffin hydrocarbons to olefins has been growing steadily in recent years. Light olefins, such as butenes, are important raw materials for the synthesis of polymers, gasoline additives and various other petrochemical products. The cracking processes especially fluid catalytic cracking and steam cracker produce high-purity mono-olefins, such as 1-butene or isobutene. Despite such processes, currently more research is focused on developing alternatives such as oxidative dehydrogenation (ODH) for two reasons: (1) undesired reactions take place at high temperature leading to coking and catalyst deactivation, making frequent regeneration of the catalyst unavoidable, (2) it consumes a large amount of heat and requires high reaction temperatures. Oxidative dehydrogenation (ODH) of n-butane is an alternative to classical dehydrogenation, steam cracking and fluid catalytic cracking processes.
Propane

Dehydrogenation of paraffins and olefins — paraffins such as n-pentane and isopentane can be converted to pentene and isopentene using chromium (III) oxide as a catalyst at 500 °C.

Formaldehyde
Formaldehyde is produced industrially by the catalytic oxidation of methanol, which can also be viewed as a dehydrogenation using  as the acceptor. The most common catalysts are silver metal, iron(III) oxide, iron molybdenum oxides [e.g. iron(III) molybdate] with a molybdenum-enriched surface, or vanadium oxides. In the commonly used formox process, methanol and oxygen react at ca. 250–400 °C in presence of iron oxide in combination with molybdenum and/or vanadium to produce formaldehyde according to the chemical equation:
2 CH3OH + O2  ->  2 CH2O + 2 H2O

Homogeneous catalytic routes
A variety of dehydrogenation processes have been described for organic compounds. These dehydrogenation is of interest in the synthesis of fine organic chemicals. Such reactions often rely on transition metal catalysts. Dehydrogenation of unfunctionalized alkanes can be effected by homogeneous catalysis.  Especially active for this reaction are pincer complexes.

Stoichiometric processes
Dehydrogenation of amines to nitriles using a variety of reagents, such as Iodine pentafluoride.

In typical aromatization, six-membered alicyclic rings, e.g. cyclohexene, can be aromatized in the presence of hydrogenation acceptors.  The elements sulfur and selenium promote this process.  On the laboratory scale, quinones, especially 2,3-Dichloro-5,6-dicyano-1,4-benzoquinone (DDQ) are effective.

Main group hydrides

The dehydrogenative coupling of silanes has also been developed.
\mathit{n}\ PhSiH3 -> {}[PhSiH]_\mathit{n}{} +  \mathit{n}\ H2
The dehydrogenation of amine-boranes is  related reaction. This process once gained interests for its potential for hydrogen storage.

References

Elimination reactions
Hydrogen